Left-wing populism, also called social populism, is a political ideology that combines left-wing politics with populist rhetoric and themes. Its rhetoric often consists of anti-elitism, opposition to the Establishment, and speaking for the "common people". Recurring themes for left-wing populists include economic democracy, social justice, and scepticism of globalization. Socialist theory plays a lesser role than in traditional left-wing ideologies.

Criticism of capitalism and globalization is also linked to unpopular United States military operations, especially those in the Middle East. It is considered that the populist left does not exclude others horizontally and relies on egalitarian ideals. Some scholars also speak of nationalist left-wing populist movements, a feature exhibited by the Sandinista Revolution in Nicaragua or the Bolivarian Revolution in Venezuela. Unlike exclusionary or right-wing populism, left-wing populist parties tend to claim to be supportive of minority rights, as well as to an idea of nationality that is not delimited by cultural or ethnic particularisms. Bernie Sanders and Alexandria Ocasio-Cortez, self-described democratic socialists, are examples of modern left-wing populist politicians in the United States. With the rise of Syriza and Podemos during the European debt crisis, there has been increased debate on new left-wing populism in Europe.

Traditionally, left-wing populism has been associated with the socialist movement; since the 2010s, there has been a movement close to left-wing populism in the left-liberal camp, some of which are considered social democratic positions. Left-liberal economic populism appealing to the working class has been prominent in some countries, such as the Joe Biden of the U.S. and Lee Jae-myung of South Korea, in the 2020s, where liberal and conservative parties are the main two parties.

By country

Americas

Argentina 

Cristina Fernández de Kirchner (the President of Argentina from 2007 to 2015) and her husband Néstor Kirchner were said to practice Kirchnerism, a variant of Peronism that was often mentioned alongside other Pink tide governments in Latin America. During Cristina Fernández de Kirchner's time in office, she spoke against certain free trade agreements, such as the proposed Free Trade Area of the Americas. Her administration was characterized by tax increases, especially on agricultural exports during the late 2000s commodities boom, Argentina's main export, in order to fund social programs such as the PROGRESAR university scholarships, the universal allocation per child subsidy (commonly referred to as AUH in Argentina, Asignación Universal por Hijo), a means-tested benefit to families with children who qualified for the subsidy, and progressive social reforms such as the recognition of same-sex marriage.

Bolivia 
The leadership of Siles Zuazo practised left-wing populism as well as that of former socialist President Evo Morales.

Brazil 

Lulism is a pragmatic centre-left ideology to the extent that it is called "socialist neoliberalism", but it appeals to a progressive, common-class image and also has populist elements in terms of popular mobilization.

Ecuador 
Rafael Correa, the former President of Ecuador, has stressed the importance of a "populist discourse" and has integrated technocrats to work within this context for the common Ecuadorians. Correa has blamed foreign non-governmental organizations for exploiting the indigenous people in the conflict between the indigenous peoples and the government.

Mexico 
The current governing party, the National Regeneration Movement, is a left-wing populist party.

United States 

Huey Long, the Great Depression-era Governor-turned-Senator of Louisiana, was one of the first modern American left-wing populists in the United States. He advocated for wealth redistribution under his Share Our Wealth plan, which had its roots in the classical left-wing populist movement of Jacksonian democracy, which is related to the radical movement.

Meanwhile, Bernie Sanders and Alexandria Ocasio-Cortez, self-described democratic socialists, are examples of modern left-wing populist politicians. Ocasio-Cortez's Democratic primary victory over the establishment Democratic Caucus Chair Joe Crowley, a 10-term incumbent, was widely seen as the biggest upset victory in the 2018 midterm election primaries. The Nation magazine described Ocasio-Cortez as a "new rock star" who was "storming the country on behalf of insurgent populists." Elizabeth Warren is also mentioned as a representative left-wing or liberal populist, and she is sometimes evaluated as a social democrat.

Venezuela 

The presidency of Hugo Chávez resembled a combination of folk wisdom and charismatic leadership with doctrinaire socialism.

Asia

Israel 
Yesh Atid is a radical centrist or liberal party. In Israeli politics, "liberal" is not particularly a concept that is distinguished by left or right, but Yesh Atid is evaluated that it has a left-wing populist element in part. They criticize elitism that causes political corruption and demand a position on material redistribution. However, Yesh Atid has an element of economic liberalism simultaneously.

Japan 
Reiwa Shinsengumi, led by Tarō Yamamoto, is a representative Japanese left-wing populist movement. While he and his party use anti-established rhetoric, they are sometimes called "liberal populist". According to experts, Yamamoto uses a simple message to spotlight single individuals left behind, including people struggling with poverty or non-permanent employment, who used to devote themselves to radical conservatism.

Reiwa Shinsengumi is also called a "progressive populist", because they are not rooted in the traditional Japanese socialist or Labor movement, but are culturally and economically progressive, representing marginalized young people and minorities.

South Korea 
South Korea's leftist political party, the Progressive Party, advocates direct democracy, anti-neoliberalism and anti-imperialism. They support a liberal-nationalist foreign policy hostile to Japan.

Lee Jae-myung, one of DPK's major politicians, has been mentioned as a "populist" in some media outlets. Lee Jae-myung pledged to implement the world's first universal basic income system if elected in the 2022 South Korean presidential election but said he would not pay for it if the people opposed it. South Korea's right-wing politician Hong Joon-pyo saw Lee Jae-myung in September 2021 and accused him of being "Chávez of Gyeonggi Province". However, there is controversy in South Korea as to whether Lee Jae-myung can be viewed as a "left-wing populist" in the context of the United States or Europe. He once said he was "conservative" and suggested policies far from general left-wing populism in the United States and Europe, partially insisting on economic liberal policies such as deregulating companies on some issues. In addition, he showed a somewhat conservative tendency on some social agendas. In addition, Kim Hyun-jong, the head of the International Trade Special Division at the Lee Jae-myung Camp, met with Henry Kissinger, and Henry Kissinger gave Lee Jae-myung a handwritten autograph called "Good wishes". In addition, Lee Jae-myung's political orientation was somewhat ambiguous, so conservative journalist Dong-A Ilbo denied that he was a left-wing politician, while South Korea's far-left organization Workers' Solidarity evaluated him as a social democratic. (However, another South Korean left-wing undongkwon group denied that Lee Jae-myung is not a social democratic.)

Europe

Germany 

The Party of Democratic Socialism was explicitly studied under left-wing populism, especially by German academics. The party was formed after the reunification of Germany, and it was similar to right-wing populists in that it relied on anti-elitism and media attention provided by charismatic leadership. The party competed for the same voter base with the right-wing populists to some extent, although it relied on a more serious platform in Eastern Germany. This was limited by anti-immigration sentiments preferred by some voters, although the lines were, for example, crossed by Oskar Lafontaine, who used a term previously associated with the Nazi Party, Fremdarbeiter ("foreign workers"), in his election campaign in 2005. The PDS merged into the Left Party in 2007. The Left Party is also viewed as a left-wing populist party, but it is not the basis of the party as a whole.

Greece 
Syriza, which became the largest party since January 2015 elections, has been described as a left-wing populist party after its platform incorporated most demands of the popular movements in Greece during the government-debt crisis. Populist traits in Syriza's platform include the growing importance of "the People" in their rhetoric and "us/the people against them/the establishment" antagonism in campaigning. On immigration and LGBT rights, Syriza is inclusionary. Syriza itself does not accept the label "populist".

Italy 
The Italian Five Star Movement (M5S), which became the largest party in the 2018 general election, has often been described as a big tent populist party, but sometimes also as a left-wing populist movement; the "five stars", which are a reference to five critical issues for the party, are public water, sustainable transport, sustainable development, right to Internet access, and environmentalism, typical proposals of left-wing populist parties. However, despite its background in left-wing politics, the M5S has often expressed right-wing views on immigration.

In September 2019, the M5S formed a government with the centre-left Democratic Party (PD) and the left-wing Free and Equal (LeU), with Giuseppe Conte at its head. The government has been sometimes referred to as a left-wing populist cabinet.

Netherlands 
The Socialist Party has run a left-wing populist platform after dropping its communist course in 1991. Although some have pointed out that the party has become less populist over the years, it still includes anti-elitism in its recent election manifestos. It opposes what it sees as the European superstate.

Spain 

The left-wing populist party Podemos achieved 8% of the national vote in the 2014 European Parliament election. Due to avoiding nativist language typical of right-wing populists, Podemos can attract left-wing voters disappointed with the political establishment without taking sides in the regional political struggle. In the 2015 election for the national parliament, Podemos reached 20.65% of the vote and became the third largest party in the parliament after the conservative People's Party with 28.71% and the Spanish Socialist Workers' Party with 22.02%. In the new parliament, Podemos holds 69 out of 350 seats, which has resulted in the end of the traditional two-party system in Spain. In a November 2018 interview with Jacobin, Íñigo Errejón argues that Podemos requires a new "national-popular" strategy to win more elections.

United Kingdom

Left-wing populist political parties

Active left-wing populist parties or parties with left-wing populist factions

Represented in national legislatures 

  – Frente de Todos 
  – Workers' Party of Belgium
  – Bulgarian Socialist Party
  – Alliance of Independent Social Democrats
  – Movement for Socialism 
  – Workers' Party, Communist Party of Brazil, Socialism and Liberty Party
  – Broad Front (factions), Chile Digno
  – Alternative Democratic Pole, Colombia Humana
  – Citizens' Alliance, Progressive Party of Working People
  – Inuit Ataqatigiit, Red–Green Alliance, Republic, Socialist People's Party
  – Dominican Liberation Party (factions)
  – Citizen Revolution Movement
  – Party of the European Left, The Left in the European Parliament – GUE/NGL
  – Estonian Centre Party
  – Left Alliance (Finland)
  – La France Insoumise
  – The Left
  – Syriza
 – Platfòm Pitit Desalin
  – Libertad y Refundación (Libre)
  – Communist Party of India (Marxist), Communist Party of India
  – Indonesian Democratic Party of Struggle, Just and Prosperous People's Party
  –  – Sinn Féin, People Before Profit–Solidarity
  – Democratic Party (factions), Five Star Movement (factions), Italian Left
  – Reiwa Shinsengumi
  – The Left
  – National Regeneration Movement, Labor Party
  – Mongolian People's Party
  – Socialist Party
  – Sandinista National Liberation Front
  – Red Party
  – Guasú Front
  – Free Peru
  - Your Movement
  – Left Bloc
  – Social Democratic Party
  – Communist Party of the Russian Federation (factions), For a New Socialism
  – United Left, Active Citizenship
  – Socialist Party of Serbia, Movement of Socialists
  – Direction - Slovak Social Democracy
  – Economic Freedom Fighters
  - Progressive Party
  – Podemos, Más País, United Left
  – Left Party
  – New Power Party
  – Peoples' Democratic Party
  – Labour Party (factions)
  – Democratic Party (factions), Democratic Socialists of America
  – United Socialist Party of Venezuela
  – ZANU–PF

Not represented in national legislatures 

  – Communist Party of Austria
  – Equality Party, Progressive Party
  – The Left, Party of Civic Rights, Communist Party of Bohemia and Moravia
  – Estonian United Left Party
  – Communist Party of Finland
  – Popular Unity, Course of Freedom
  – Communist Refoundation Party, Democracy and Autonomy, Power to the People
  – People's Mujahedin of Iran
  – Socialist Party of Malaysia
  – Namibian Economic Freedom Fighters
  – Patriots of Russia, Left Bloc, Left Front, Russian Socialist Movement
  – Party of the Radical Left
  – Socialists.sk
  – Patriotic Party (Turkey)
  – Communist Party of Ukraine
  – Scottish Socialist Party, Northern Independence Party

See also 

 Chantal Mouffe
 Chavismo
 Democratic socialism
 Equalitarianism
 Ernesto Laclau
 Jacobin (politics)
 Kirchnerism
 Lulism
 Lumpenproletariat
 Left-liberalism
 Left-libertarianism
 Radicalism (historical)
 Left-wing nationalism
 Narodniks
 New Left
 Pink tide
 Popular socialism
 Post-capitalism
 Post-neoliberalism
 Progressivism
 Economic progressivism
 Progressive liberalism
 Redwashing
 Right-wing populism
 Social democracy
 Socialism of the 21st century
 Welfare state

References

Further reading 
 
 Dingeldey, Philip (2021). "A People's Tribunate in a Populist Democracy? A Thought Experiment between Republicanism and Populism re-visited.” In: Mayr, Stefan/ Orator, Andreas (eds.): Populism, Popular Sovereignty, and Public Reason (= Central and Eastern European Forum for Legal, Political, and Social Theory Yearbook, Vol. 10). Peter Lang. ISBN 9783631840832, pp. 71-84.

External links 
 "The winds are changing: a new left populism for Europe". London School of Economics. Eurocrisis in the Press. 2015.

 
Populism
Political spectrum
Progressivism
Socialism
Political terminology
Populism